Declan is the debut studio album by singer Declan Galbraith. It was released on 22 September 2002 in the United Kingdom, when Galbraith was only 10 years old.

Track listing
 "Danny boy" (Frederic E. Weatherly) – 3:29
 "Carrickfergus" (Alan Connaught, Traditional) – 4:08
 "Imagine" (John Lennon) – 3:03
 "I'll be there" (Hal Davis, Berry Gordy, Jr., Bob West) – 4:32
 "It All Begins With Love" (Mack, Mason) – 4:36
 "Your Friend" (Mack, Mason) – 4:19
 "Love can build a bridge" (John, Naomi Judd, Paul Overstreet) – 4:02
 "Mama Said" (Mack, Mason) – 3:33
 "Till The Day We Meet Again" (Mack, Mason) – 4:33
 "Amazing grace" (John Newton) – 3:21
 "Circles In The Sand" (Mack, Mason) – 3:45
 "Angels" (Guy Chambers, Robbie Williams) – 4:08
 "Tell me why" (Mack, Mason) – 4:24
 "Twinkle twinkle little star (Declan's prayer)" – 1:45

Unreleased songs
 "The New Year Song 2003" Tell Me Why CD Single.
 "For a Better Tomorrow"
 "Walking In the Air" Christmas CD.

Personnel 

Ryan Art – design
Keith Bessey – mixing, mastering
Simon Blendis – violin
Anthony Clark – acoustic guitar, 12-string acoustic guitar
Timothy Eames – percussion, drums, electric guitar, programming, engineering, mixing, Pro-Tools
Declan Galbraith – vocals
Jan Hendrickse – flute, whistling
Mark Hornby – acoustic guitar, nylon string guitar
Tom Howard – photography
Stephen Hussey – violin, conducting, orchestration, string arrangements, orchestral arrangements
Dominic Kelly – oboe, cor anglais
Nathan King – acoustic guitar, electric guitar, nylon string guitar
Noel Langley – trumpet, Flugelhorn
Sara Loewenthal – copyist
Barry Mason – arrangements, executive production
Craig McLeish – conducting
Tom Norris – leader
Catherine Porter – background vocals
Jim Rattigan – French horn
Rowland Sutherland – flute
Roy Theaker – violin, leader
Urban Soul Orchestra – orchestra
Lucy Wakeford – harp
Chris Worsey – cello 

Declan Galbraith albums
2002 debut albums
EMI Records albums